Daiwie Fu (first name pronunciated from Taiwanese Hokkien, born September 1953) is a Taiwanese academic, and the founding editor-in-chief of the STS academic journal East Asian Science, Technology and Society. He was formerly Distinguished Professor of the graduate institute of STS, now Emeritus Professor, in National Yang-Ming Chao-Tong University. His research areas are science and technology studies, gender and medicine in modern Taiwan, gender and science, East Asian STS, history and philosophy of science, and the history of Chinese science (mainly on biji, Mengxi Bitan and the cultural history of science in the Song Dynasty). He has published papers in Chinese, English, Italian, Korean, and Japanese. He published three academic books, several social criticisms, and has founded several Taiwanese magazines and academic journals, including the radical journal, Taiwan: a Radical Quarterly in Social Studies. Since the lifting of Taiwan's martial law, he has also participated in social activist movements.

Publications
Selected academic works and social criticisms
 Knowledge Pursuits in Heterogeneous Spaces and Times: Collections of Papers in History and Philosophy of Science (異時空裡的知識追逐)（1992 in Chinese，東大）。
 Philosophy and Conceptual History of Science in Taiwan, co-eds. with Lin Cheng-Hung (1992, Kluwer）
 Assembling the Asiastic New Body: Gender/Sexuality, Medicine, and Modern Taiwan（亞細亞的新身體：性別、醫療與近代台灣） (2005 in Chinese，群學)。
 A Genealogical History of STS and Its Multiple Constructions: To Weave an Extensive Network for Gazing upon the Modern Sciences（STS的緣起與多重建構:橫看近代科學的一種編織與打造）(2019 in Chinese，臺大出版中心)。

Books in social criticisms and edited collections 
 Radical Notes (基進筆記）（1990 in Chineses)
 The Spaces of Knowledge and Power (知識與權力的空間 )（1990 in Chinese）
 Knowledge, Power, and Women (知識、權力、與女人)（1993 in Chinese）
 Three Answers to the What is Science Question (回答科學是什麼的三個答案 )（2006 in Chinese）
 Kuhn's Critical Reader, co-edited with Chu Yuan-Hong (孔恩評論集) (2001 in Chinese，巨流）
Translations:  T. Kuhn's The Structure of Scientific Revolutions (with Cheng Shude, Wang daohuan）（1985, the newest 4th edition in 2021)

Philosophy of science, and other social studies of Taiwan
 1986, Sep., "Problem Domain and Developmental Strategies──a Study on the Logic of Competition and Development of Scientific Programs", Ph.D. Thesis, Columbia University, New York, US (Microfilms Inc., Account No. DA 058785. Ann Arbor, MI.)   
 1989, Jan, "The Dialectic of the History of Positivistic Science as a Discourse: From Enlightenment in the West to Yin Hai-Kuang in Taiwan", Taiwan: A Radical Quarterly in SocialStudies, Vol.1, 4, pp. 11–56    
 1994, “H2O 的一個不可共量史──重論「不可共量性」及其與意義理論之爭”(“A History of Incommensuability for ‘H2O’”)《第四屆美國文學與思想研討會論文選集》，哲學篇，中央研究院歐美所, pp. 95–122。    
 1995, Sep., “Higher Taxonomy and Higher Incommensurability” Studies in History and Philosophy of Science, Vol. 26, No. 3, pp. 273–294.    
 1997, 「百朗森林裡的文字獵人──試讀台灣原住民的漢文書寫」收入《身份認同與公共文化》 ("Words Hunters in the Jungle of BAI-LANG--- A Reading on the Chinese Writings by Taiwan's aborigines", originally published in Con-Temporary magazine, and later published in Oxford Univ. Press HongKong) 陳清橋編，1997，牛津大學出版社。pp. 385–412。  
 2019,「基進2.0」(“Radicality, 2.0”)《臺灣理論關鍵詞》史書美、梅家玲、廖朝陽、陳東升主編，頁205-217（聯經）
 2021, “Kuhn in the humanities and social studies of science”, a General Introduction for the fourth edition of the Taiwanese translation of T. Kuhn's The Structure of Scientific Revolution (1962), published by Yuan-Liou, Taipei.

Chinese history of science
 1988, June, "A Study on the Historical Development and Transformation of ZHOU-BI （周髀）Research Tradition", Tsing Hua Journal of Chinese Studies, new series 18, no.1, pp. 1–41.  
 1991, May, "Why Did Liu Hui Fail to Derive the Volume of a Sphere?" Historica Mathematica, Vol. 18, pp. 212–238.  
 1993–4, Nov., “A Contextual and Taxonomic Study on the 'Divine Marvels' and 'Strange Occurrences' in Mengxi Bitan”, Chinese Science, No. 11, pp. 3–35.  
 1998, July, “On Crossing Taxonomies and Boundaries: A Critical Note on Comparative History of Science and Zhao Youqin’s ‘Optics’”, Taiwanese Journal for Philosophy and History of Science, No. 8, (1996–1997), pp. 103–127.  
 1999, “On Mengxi Bitan’s [夢溪筆談] World of Marginalities and ‘South-Pointing Needles’: Fragment Translation vs. Contextual Translation” De l’Un au Multiple. De la traduction du Chinois dans les langues Europeennes, edited by Viviane Alleton and Michael Lackner, pp. 175–201, Editions de la Maison de Sciences de l’Homme.  
 2001, “An Early Geomantic Theory and its Relation to Compass Deviation”, Ch.11.2, History of Science in China Volume, Encyclopedia for History of Science, sponsored by Enciclopedia Italiana and Académie internationale d’histoire des sciences. (Italian version: Storia Della Scienza, Vol.II, Sezione I, La Scienza in Cina, ch.11.2, pp. 119–25.Its English original manuscript is available upon request.)
 2007, “The Flourishing of Biji or Pen-Notes Texts and its Relations to History of Knowledge in Song China (960-1279)”, in a special issue “What did it mean to write an Encyclopedia in China?”, pp. 103–130, Hors Serie, Extrême-Orient, Extrême-Occident, 2007, Presses Universitaires de Vincennes.
 2010, “When Shen Gua Encountered the ‘Natural World’--- A Preliminary Discussion on Mengxi Bitan and the Concept of Nature”, eds., by Hans Ulrich Vogel and Günter Dux, in Concepts of Nature: A Chinese-European Cross-Cultural Perspective, Brill: Leiden & Boston (2010), pp. 285–309.

Gender and science, gender and medicine in modern Taiwan
 1996, April, "Women Scientists in Taiwan and their Current Situations in Science, Gender, and Society"，Taiwan: A Radical Quarterly in Social Studies, no. 22, pp. 1–58。
 1999, June, "A Feeling for Corn Field in Keller's 'Non-Masculine' Science"，pp. 1–40.  
 2006, “CS, VBAC, and an Ironic Past in Taiwan’s Obstetrics” in No.2, Gender and Sexuality, pp. 25–41, CGS, International Christian University, Tokyo, Japan.  
 2017，"Contemporary multiple evolutions of the ‘medicalization’ thesis and commentaries from gender and social studies of medicine"

Science and technology studies, East Asian STS, genealogy of SSK/STS
 2007, “How far can East Asian STS go?”, position paper, 1st issue of EASTS (East Asian Science, Technology and Society: an International Journal), Vol. 1, no. 1, pp. 1–14.  
 2009, “대만의 1세대 남녀 산부인과 의사: 식민지적 의료근대화와 젠더 구조” translated and revised from the SNUH symposium (2nd International Symposium: The First Generation of Native Doctors in East Asian Countries, Seoul National University Hospital) article “Two first-generation Obstetrics-Gynecology doctors in Taiwan: Colonial Medical Modernity and Gender Structure”, 동아시아 1세대 의사들의 생애, pp. 200–57.
 2013,「定位與多重越界：回首重看STS與科哲」(Positions and Multiple Boundary-Crossings ---A Reflection on the Relationship between STS and Philosophy of Science)，《科技、醫療與社會》，No. 16. pp. 49–102.
 2020, “A genealogical explication on the emergence and constructions of STS: a view from East Asia,” Tapuya: Latin American Science, Technology and Society, Vol. 3, no. 1, (pp. 1–11)

References

Living people
Year of birth missing (living people)